One Hundred Aspects of the Moon or  in Japanese is a collection of 100 ōban size ukiyo-e woodblock prints by Japanese artist Tsukioka Yoshitoshi printed in batches, starting in 1885 until 1892. It represents one of Yoshitoshi's later works. The woodblock prints feature various famous figures, both historical and literary characters, each in a moonlit scene as well as occasional references to poetry.

History
This series of 100 prints was published in 1885-92 by Akiyama Buemon. The subjects are drawn from various sources in Japanese and Chinese history and literature, Kabuki and Noh theatre, and even contemporary Tokyo, linked only by the presence of the moon in each print. The creation of mood according to the phase of the moon was exploited for its poetic and expressive possibilities. This was the most successful and still the most famous of Yoshitoshi’s print series. People would queue before dawn to buy each new design and still find the edition sold out.

List of prints

References

External links 

 Series on the Diet Collection
 About the series
 Descriptions of each print
 About the series at internationalfolkart.org

Ukiyo-e print series
19th-century prints